Showcase is the fourth album by the Los Angeles, California-based R&B group the Sylvers.

Reception

Released in 1975, this would be their first of three albums for Capitol Records and one of two that were produced by Freddie Perren.

The album released only two singles: "Boogie Fever" reaching number one in the U.S. on both the Billboard Hot 100 and Hot Soul Singles charts as well as reaching number one in Canada on the RPM national singles chart in 1976. The second single "Cotton Candy" peaked on Billboard R&B Chart Position #19.

Track listing
"Cotton Candy" (Kenneth St. Lewis, Freddie Perren, Christine Yarian) – 2:55
"The Roulette Wheel of Love" (Freddie Perren, Kenneth St. Lewis) – 3:25
"Boogie Fever" (Freddie Perren, Kenneth St. Lewis) – 3:31
"Storybook Girl" (R. Wyatt, Christine Yarian, St. Lewis) – 3:20
"Ain't No Good in Good-Bye" (Freddie Perren, Kenneth St. Lewis) – 3:40
"Free Style" (Leon Sylvers III) – 2:59
"I Can Be for Real" (Leon Sylvers III) – 3:38
"Clap Your Hands to the Music" (Leon Sylvers III) – 3:30
"Keep On Keepin' On" (R. Wyatt, Christine Yarian, Freddie Perren) – 3:16
"Ain't Nothin' but a Party" (Leon Sylvers III) – 5:24

Charts

Singles

Personnel
Credits adapted from liner notes.

 Freddie Perren - producer, arranger
 Wade Marcus - arranger
 Larkin Arnold - executive producer
 Larry Miles - recording engineer, remixing
 Steve Pouliot - assistant engineer
 Andrew Berliner - engineer (strings and horns)
 Jeff Sanders - mastering

References

External links
 Showcase at Discogs

1975 albums
The Sylvers albums
Capitol Records albums
Albums arranged by Wade Marcus
Albums produced by Freddie Perren
Albums recorded at Total Experience Recording Studios